Viola aurea is a species of violet known by the common names golden violet and bright yellow violet. It is native to eastern California and western Nevada, where it is known from scattered occurrences in various types of dry habitat such as the slopes of desert mountains. This herb grows from a tough taproot and produces a woolly-haired stem up to about 13 centimeters tall. The leaves have toothed or wrinkled, rounded or oval blades borne on petioles. They are coated in thick, white hairs. A solitary flower is borne on an upright stem. It has five yellow petals, the lowest one marked with brown veining and the upper pair tinged with brown or purple on the outer surface.

This species is sometimes considered a subspecies of Viola purpurea.

External links
Jepson Manual Treatment
The Nature Conservancy
Photo gallery

aurea
Flora of California
Flora of Nevada